Edo Joe Vanni (April 2, 1918 – April 30, 2007) was an American player, coach, manager and front office executive in minor league baseball. A lifelong resident of the Seattle area, he was called "the face of Seattle baseball" upon his death, at 89, of heart failure in Bellevue, Washington, on April 30, 2007.

Career
Vanni attended Seattle's Queen Anne High School and the University of Washington (where he played freshman football) before beginning his professional playing career as an outfielder with the 1938 Seattle Rainiers of the Pacific Coast League. He was an integral player of their pennant-winning teams of 1939–41.

During World War II, Vanni was stationed at the Pasco (Wash.) Naval Air Station, where he managed the station's baseball team, called the Flyers. Vanni played 11 seasons for the Rainiers, worked in their front office, and managed them in 1964 when they were the top affiliate of the Boston Red Sox.

He also played and managed in the Class A Western International League with the Vancouver Capilanos (1952) and the Kennewick-based Tri-City Braves (1953–54) and the Class B Northwest League, the WIL's successor, with the Wenatchee Chiefs (1955–56).

After he hung up his uniform, he was the general manager of the Triple-A Seattle Angels (1965–68), and worked in the front office as director of group ticket sales for the Seattle Pilots during their lone American League season, 1969.  The Seattle Mariners gave him a lifetime pass to their stadium, and his own parking space.

Seattle baseball historian Dave Eskenazi called him "the dean of Seattle baseball."

References

Johnson, Lloyd, and Wolff, Miles, ed., The Encyclopedia of Minor League Baseball, 1997 edition. Durham, North Carolina: Baseball America.
The Seattle Times, "Loss of Vanni Leaves Void in Seattle", May 10, 2007.

External links
 
 NWSABR – 1949 photo
 

1918 births
2007 deaths
Baseball coaches from Washington (state)
Baseball players from Seattle
Birmingham Barons players
Minor league baseball managers
Seattle Pilots
Seattle Rainiers players
Spokane Indians players
Tri-City Braves players
Wenatchee Chiefs players
Vancouver Capilanos players
Victoria Athletics players
Yakima Bears players